The pedal steel guitar is a console-type of steel guitar with pedals and knee levers that change the pitch of certain strings to enable playing more varied and complex music than other steel guitar designs. Like all steel guitars, it can play unlimited glissandi (sliding notes) and deep vibrati—characteristics it shares with the human voice. Pedal steel is most commonly associated with American country music and Hawaiian music.

Pedals were added to a lap steel guitar in 1940, allowing the performer to play a major scale without moving the bar and also to push the pedals while striking a chord, making passing notes slur or bend up into harmony with existing notes. The latter creates a unique sound that has been popular in country and western music— a sound not previously possible on steel guitars before pedals were added.

From its first use in Hawaii in the 19th century, the steel guitar sound became popular in the United States in the first half of the 20th century and spawned a family of instruments designed specifically to be played with the guitar in a horizontal position, also known as "Hawaiian-style". The first instrument in this chronology was the Hawaiian guitar also called a lap steel; next was a lap steel with a resonator to make it louder, first made by National and Dobro Corporation. The electric guitar pickup was invented in 1934, allowing steel guitars to be heard equally with other instruments. Electronic amplification enabled subsequent development of the electrified lap steel, then the console steel, and finally the pedal steel guitar.

Playing the pedal steel has unusual physical requirements in requiring simultaneous coordination of both hands, both feet and both knees (knees operate levers on medial and lateral sides of each knee); the only other instrument with similar requirements is the American reed organ. Pioneers in development of the instrument include Buddy Emmons, Jimmy Day, Bud Isaacs, Zane Beck, and Paul Bigsby. In addition to American country music, the instrument is used in sacred music in the eastern and southern United States (called Sacred Steel), jazz, and Nigerian Music.

Early history and evolution

In the late 19th century, Spanish guitars were introduced in the Hawaiian Islands by European sailors and Mexican "vaqueros".  Hawaiians did not embrace the standard guitar tuning that had been in use upon their introduction. Rather, they re-tuned the guitars to make them sound a major chord when all six strings were strummed, now known as an "open tuning". The term for this is "slack-key" because certain strings were "slackened" to achieve it. To change chords, they used some smooth object, usually a piece of pipe or metal, sliding it over the strings to the fourth or fifth position, easily playing a three-chord song. It is physically difficult to hold a steel bar against the strings while holding the guitar against the body and the Hawaiians laid the guitar across the lap and played it while sitting.  Playing this way became popular throughout Hawaii and spread internationally.

Electrific amplification

Hawaiian lap steel guitars were not loud enough to compete with other instruments, a problem that many inventors were trying to remedy. In Los Angeles in the 1920s, a steel guitar player named George Beauchamp saw some inventions which added a horn, like a megaphone, to steel guitars to make them louder. Beauchamp became interested, and went to a shop near his home to learn more. The shop was owned by a violin repairman named  John Dopyera. Dopyera and his brother Rudy, showed Beauchamp a prototype of theirs which looked like a big Victrola horn attached to a guitar, but it was not successful. Their next attempt yielded some success with a resonator cone, resembling a large metal loudspeaker, attached under the bridge of the guitar. Buoyed by their success, Beauchamp joined the Dopyera brothers in forming a company to pursue their invention. The new resonator invention was promoted at a lavish party in Los Angeles and demonstrated by the well-known Hawaiian steel player Sol Hoopii. An investor wrote a check for $12,000 that very night.

A factory was built to manufacture metal-body guitars with the new resonators. Money problems and disagreements followed, and the Doperyas won a legal battle against Beauchamp over the company, then went on their own to form "the Dobro Corporation", Dobro being an acronym for DOpyera and BROthers. Beauchamp was out of a job. He had been thinking about an "electric guitar" for years, and at least part of the dispute with the Dopyeras was over him spending too much time on the electrification idea and not enough on improving the resonator guitar. Beauchamp enrolled in electronics courses and, for his first effort, he made a single-string guitar out of a 2x4 piece of lumber and experimented with phonograph pickups, but had no success. He eventually came up with the idea of using two horseshoe magnets encircling the guitar strings like a bracelet, and six small metal rods wrapped with wire to concentrate the magnetic field (one under each guitar string).

When connected to an electronic amplifier and loudspeaker, it worked. He enlisted the aid of a skilled craftsman to fashion a guitar neck and body to connect to his device. The final construct, he thought, resembled a frying pan, and that is what the instrument was nicknamed. He applied for patent June 2, 1934 and received it on August 10, 1937. Beauchamp asked a nearby engineer named Adolph Rickenbacker to help manufacture the product and together they founded a company first named "Ro-Pat-In", soon changed to "ElectroString". The guitar brand was called "Rickenbacker" because they thought the name was easier to pronounce than "Beauchamp" (pronounced Beecham) and because Adolph's cousin, Eddie Rickenbacker, an American pilot and WWI flying ace, was a well-known name in the U.S. at that time.

In 1931, the Great Depression was at its worst, and people were not buying guitars; in addition, the patent office delayed on the application, in part because they had no category for the  invention—was it a musical instrument or an electrical device?  Electrostring's competitors infringed on the patent, but the owners did not have the money to litigate the infringements. Beauchamp was ultimately deprived of economic benefit for his invention because his competitors rapidly improved on it making his specific patent obsolete. Electrostring's most successful product was the Hawaiian guitar (lap steel) A22 "Frying Pan", the first electrified instrument of any kind — made with a metal body, smaller than a traditional Spanish guitar, to be played on the musician's lap.

Two additional breakthroughs emerged: One, the guitar amplifier, which had to be purchased in order to use the invention; and two, perhaps unrealized at the time, that electrified guitars no longer had to have the traditional guitar shape—this profoundly influenced electric guitar designs forever forward.

Lap steel

The first lap steels had a smaller body, but still retained a guitar-like shape. Instrument makers rapidly began making them into a rectangular block of wood with an electric pickup, the precursor of the pedal steel. According to music writer Michael Ross, the first electrified stringed instrument on a commercial recording was a western swing tune by Bob Dunn in 1935. He recorded with Milton Brown and his Musical Brownies. Brown has been called "The father of western swing"  The inherent limitation of the lap steel was its constraint to very limited chords not changeable during a performance without re-tuning. For that reason, scores of different tunings are available for lap steel players.

Lap steel becomes console steel

The next problem to be dealt with was the need to play with different voicings on the same guitar; i.e., the way the strings are tuned. The only way to accomplish this at the time was the addition of a duplicate neck and strings on the same instrument, tuned differently. Players continued to add more necks, eventually getting up to four. This meant a bigger and heavier instrument, now called a "console" which necessitated putting it on a stand or legs rather than the performer's lap. Noel Boggs, a lap steel player with Bob Wills, received the first steel guitar made by instrument maker Leo Fender in 1953. Fender relied on prominent performers to field test his instruments. Boggs was one of the first players to switch to a different neck during a solo. Leon McAuliffe, composer of "Steel Guitar Rag", also played with Bob Wills, and used a multi-neck steel guitar. When Wills said his well-known tag line, "Take it away, Leon", he was referring to McAuliffe. A Fender Stringmaster triple-neck console steel was heard in a number one hit song in 1959,"Sleep Walk", a steel guitar instrumental by Santo and Johnny, the Farina Brothers.

Console steel becomes pedal steel

The expense of building multiple necks on the same instrument made them unaffordable for most players, and a more sophisticated solution was needed. At this point, the goal was simply to create a pedal that would change the pitch of all the strings at once to emulate a second neck. In 1939, a guitar called the "Electradaire" featured a pedal controlling a solenoid, triggering an electrical apparatus to change the tension on the strings. This was not successful. That same year, bandleader Alvino Rey worked with a machinist to design pedals to change the pitch of strings but was without success. The Harlan Brothers of Indianapolis created the "Multi-Kord" with a universal pedal that could fairly easily be configured to adjust the pitch of any or all strings, but was extremely hard to push when tensioning all strings at once. The Gibson Guitar Company introduced the "Electraharp" in 1940, which featured pedals radially oriented from a single axis at the instrument's left rear leg. The instrument was not popular and only 43 were sold before production was halted, but the U.S. entry into World War II played a part in lack of demand. After WW II, Gibson redesigned and reintroduced the Electraharp and Bud Isaacs used one on the song "Big Blue Diamonds" for King Records.   The most successful pedal system from the various contenders was designed about 1948 by Paul Bigsby, a motorcycle shop foreman and racer who also invented the commercially successful Spanish guitar vibrato tailpiece. Bigsby put pedals on a rack between the two front legs of the steel guitar. The pedals operated a mechanical linkage to apply tension to raise the pitch of the strings.

Bigsby built guitars incorporating his design for the foremost steel players of the day, including Speedy West, Noel Boggs, and Bud Isaacs, but Bigsby was a one-man operation working out of his garage at age 56, and not capable of keeping up with demand. One of Bigsby's first guitars was used on "Candy Kisses" in 1949 by Eddie Kirk. The second model Bigsby made went to Speedy West, who used it extensively.

Pedal steel in country music: the birth of a new sound

In 1953, Bud Isaacs received one of Bigsby's new creations, a double-neck steel which featured pedals to change the pitch of only two strings. Isaacs was the first to push the pedal while notes were still sounding. Other steel players strictly avoided doing this, because it was considered "un-Hawaiian".   When Isaacs first used the setup on the 1953 recording of Webb Pierce's song "Slowly", he pushed the pedal while playing a chord, so notes could be heard bending up from below into the existing chord to harmonize with the other strings, creating a stunning effect which had not been possible with the older (non-pedal) lap steels. Of this recording of "Slowly", steel guitar virtuoso Lloyd Green said, "This fellow, Bud Isaacs, had thrown a new tool into musical thinking about the steel with the advent of this record  that still reverberates to this day."  It was the birth of the future sound of country music and caused a virtual revolution among steel players who wanted to duplicate it.

Also in the 1950s, steel guitar hall-of-famer Zane Beck added knee levers to the pedal steel guitar capable of bending notes downward. The player can move each knee either right, left or up (depending on the model) triggering different pitch changes. The levers function basically the same as foot pedals, and may be used alone, in combination with the other knee, or more commonly, in combination with one or two foot pedals. They were first added to Ray Noren's console steel. Initially, the knee levers just lowered the pitch, but in later years with refinements, could raise or lower pitch.

Buddy Emmons' contributions to pedal steel

When "Slowly" was released, Bigsby was in the process of building a guitar for steel virtuoso Buddy Emmons. Emmons heard Isaacs' performance on the song, and told Bigsby to make his guitar setup to split the function of Isaacs' single pedal into two pedals, each controlling a different string. This gave the advantages of making chords without having to slant or move the bar, e.g., minors and suspended chords. Jimmy Day, another prominent steel player of the day, did the same thing, but reversed which strings were affected by the two pedals. This prompted future manufacturers to ask customers if they wanted a "Day" or an "Emmons" setup. In 1957, Emmons partnered with guitarist/machinist Harold "Shot" Jackson to form the Sho-Bud company, the first company devoted solely to pedal steel guitar manufacture.

Emmons made other innovations to the steel guitar, adding two additional strings (known as "chromatics") and a third pedal, changes which have been adopted as standard in the modern-day E9 instrument. The additional strings allow the player to play a major scale without moving the bar. He also developed and patented a mechanism to raise and lower the pitch of a string on a steel guitar and return to the original pitch without going out of tune. The Sho-Bud instruments of the day had all the latest features: 10 strings, the third pedal, and the knee levers.

Modern pedal steel

 The pedal steel continues to be an instrument in transition. In the United States, as of 2017, the E9 neck is more common, but most pedal steels still have two necks. The C6 is typically used for western swing music and the E9 neck is more often used for country music. The different necks have distinctly different voicings. The C6 has a wider pitch range than the E9, mostly on the lower notes.
Certain players prefer different setups regarding which function the pedals and levers perform, and which string tuning is preferred. In the early 1970s, musician Tom Bradshaw coined the term copedent, a portmanteau of "chord-pedal-arrangement". Often represented in table form, it is a way of specifying the instrument's tuning, pedal and lever setup, string gauges and string windings.

There are proponents of a "universal tuning" to combine the two most popular modern tunings (E9 and C6) into a single 12 or 14-string neck that encompasses some features of each. It was developed by Maurice Anderson and later modified by Larry Bell. By lowering the C6 tuning a half-step to make it a B6, many commonalities with the E9 tuning are achieved on the same neck and it is called the E9/B6 tuning.

Use in non-traditional genres

The pedal steel most commonly associated with American country music, but it is also sometimes heard in jazz, sacred music, popular music, nu jazz, and African music.
In the United States in the 1930s, during the steel guitar's wave of popularity, the instrument was introduced into the House of God, a branch of an African-American Pentecostal denomination, based primarily in Nashville and Indianapolis. The sound bore no resemblance to typical American country music. The  steel guitar was embraced by the congregation and often took the place of an organ. The first documented use of a pedal (rather than lap) steel in this tradition was in 1952, but it did not become
common until the early 1970s. This musical genre, known as "Sacred Steel" was largely unknown until, in the 1980s, a minister's son named Robert Randolph took up the instrument  as a teenager, and has popularized it and received critical acclaim as a musician. Neil Strauss, writing in the New York Times, called Randolph "one of the most original and talented pedal steel guitarists of his generation.

The pedal steel guitar became a signature component of Nigerian Juju music in the late 1970s. Nigerian bandleader King Sunny Adé featured pedal steel guitar in his 17 piece band, which, wrote New York Times reviewer Jon Pareles, introduces "a twang or two from American blues and country"  Norwegian jazz trumpeter Nils Petter Molvaer, considered a pioneer of Future jazz (a fusion of jazz and electronic music), released the album Switch, which features the pedal steel guitar.

See also
Steel guitar
Console steel guitar
Lap steel guitar
Electric guitar
Frying Pan (guitar)
Resonator guitar
Slack-key guitar
Slide guitar

Notes

References

External links 
 Universal tuning
 The British Steelies Society Forum 
 Steel Guitar Forum – A discussion site for pedal steel, lap steel, and related musical instruments
 Steel Guitar Jazz – A website featuring pedal and nonpedal steel guitar in jazz music – run by Jim Cohen
 www.pedalsteel.co.uk – website run by Bob Adams

Electric guitars
Steel guitar
Box zithers
Amplified instruments
Continuous pitch instruments
 
Sacred musical instruments
Musical instruments by year
1940 musical instruments